Zolotonoshsky Uyezd (Золотоношский уезд) was one of the subdivisions of the Poltava Governorate of the Russian Empire. It was situated in the western part of the governorate. Its administrative centre was Zolotonosha.

Demographics
At the time of the Russian Empire Census of 1897, Zolotonoshsky Uyezd had a population of 227,795. Of these, 95.5% spoke Ukrainian, 3.4% Yiddish, 0.9% Russian and 0.1% Polish as their native language.

References

 
Uezds of Poltava Governorate
Poltava Governorate